Johann Sadie (born 23 January 1989 in Malmesbury, South Africa) is a professional South African rugby union player. He usually plays as a centre and currently plays for French Top 14 side .

Rugby career

Stormers / Western Province

Bulls / Blue Bulls

His time in Pretoria was not a happy one and he only managed 10 Super Rugby appearances and 3 games in the Currie Cup.

Cheetahs / Free State Cheetahs

He joined the  after the 2012 Currie Cup Premier Division and made an instant impact in Bloemfontein scoring 5 tries during the 2013 Super Rugby season.

Agen

After the 2015 Super Rugby season, he joined French Top 14 side  on a two-year deal.

International

Sadie represented South Africa U20 at the 2009 IRB Junior World Championship in Japan scoring 1 try in 4 matches.

References

1989 births
Living people
People from Malmesbury, Western Cape
Afrikaner people
South African rugby union players
Stormers players
Rugby union centres
Bulls (rugby union) players
Blue Bulls players
Cheetahs (rugby union) players
Free State Cheetahs players
Western Province (rugby union) players
Stellenbosch University alumni
Alumni of Paarl Gimnasium
South Africa Under-20 international rugby union players
South African expatriate rugby union players
South African expatriate sportspeople in Japan
Expatriate rugby union players in Japan
NTT DoCoMo Red Hurricanes Osaka players
Rugby union players from the Western Cape